Mick Murray may refer to:

 Mick Murray (Irish republican) (c. 1936–1999), Irish Republican Army bomber, best known for his role in the Birmingham pub bombings
 Mick Murray (politician) (born 1949), member of the Western Australian Legislative Assembly
 Mick Murray (leader), leader of the Comanchero Motorcycle Club

See also
Michael Murray (disambiguation)